Motorcycle taxis in India are a form of taxicab services. They have existed since 1981, when the Government of Goa started issuing permits to operate them.

History 
The Goa Motorcycle Taxi Riders Association (GMTRA) was founded in 1980 to operate motorcycle taxis in the state. Operators are referred to as pilots and operate using yellow coloured motorcycles. They are not regulated by a fare meter.

References 

Delhi (Capital of India) has its own bike taxi running on eco friendly bikes. Launched by Promto

Road transport in India
Taxis of India
Motorcycling in India